Anyoli Amorette Abrego Sanjur, born 16 November 1987, is a Panamanian model and beauty pageant contestant winner of the Señorita Panamá 2010 contest on 8 July 2010. She represented Panama in the 59th Miss Universe 2010 which was held in the Mandalay Bay Events Center, Las Vegas, Nevada, United States, on 23 August 2010.

Abrego's start in the modeling world took place when she joined the "Chica Modelo" (a model search) contest in 2006, where she won at 19 years old. It also gave her the chance to work for Physical Modelos, her official modeling agency as of today. As a model, Anyoli has been in calendars, commercials and stewardess of different events.

Anyoli also competed in the Ford Super Model of the World 2006 in NY, in the Miss Model of The World 2009, where she reached the semi-final round. There she gained the contest Miss Beauty International 2007 in Ecuador and the Miss Pacifico 2010 in Playa Linda, Chiapas, México, where she was first runner up, later Abrego assume the title of Miss Pacifico when the Miss Pacifico Organization revoked the crown from then reigning titleholder.

See also
 Diana Broce

References

External links
Señorita Panamá Official Website
Telemetro.com

1987 births
Living people
Miss Universe 2010 contestants
Panamanian beauty pageant winners
Panamanian female models
Señorita Panamá